Tulip fingers are a cutaneous condition, a combined allergic and irritant contact dermatitis caused by contact with tulip bulbs.

See also 
 Textile dermatitis
 List of cutaneous conditions

References 

Contact dermatitis